Ja Chaču Tebja is the third album by the Slovak punk rock/comedy rock band Horkýže Slíže, released in March 2000.

Track list

Personnel
 Peter Hrivňák (Kuko) – lead vocals, bass guitar
 Mário Sabo (Sabotér) – lead guitar, backing vocals, co-lead vocals on 4
 Juraj Štefánik (Doktor) – rhythm guitar, backing vocals, co-lead vocals on 4, 5 and 9
 Martin Košovan (Košo) – drums

External links 
Horkýže Slíže official website

2000 albums
Horkýže Slíže albums